Caladenia cruscula, commonly known as the reclining spider orchid is a species of orchid endemic to a small area in the south-west of Western Australia. It has a single hairy leaf and a single cream-coloured flower with a long red fringe on the sides of its labellum.

Description 
Caladenia cruscula is a terrestrial, perennial, deciduous, herb with an underground tuber and which grows as solitary plants or in loose clumps. The petals are narrower than the lateral sepals. The labellum is uniformly cream-coloured except for the red fringe on the edges and the red calli in the centre of the labellum. There are four rows of pale maroon, golf stick-shaped calli in the centre of the labellum, decreasing in size towards its tip. Flowering occurs from August to September.

Taxonomy and naming
Caladenia cruscula was first formally described by Stephen Hopper and Andrew Brown in 2001 from a specimen collected by Alex George in the Kau Rock Nature Reserve north east of Esperance. The description was published in Nuytsia. The specific epithet (cruscula) is a Latin word meaning "little leg" and refers to the relatively short sepals and petals of this species, compared to those of similar orchids.

Distribution and habitat 
The reclining spider orchid is found between Salmon Gums and Mount Ragged in the Coolgardie, Esperance Plains and Mallee biogeographic regions. It grows in moist places near granite outcrops, salt lakes and flats, usually under eucalypts or melaleucas.

Conservation
Caladenia cruscula is classified as "not threatened" by the Western Australian Government Department of Parks and Wildlife.

References

cruscula
Orchids of Western Australia
Endemic orchids of Australia
Plants described in 2001
Endemic flora of Western Australia
Taxa named by Andrew Phillip Brown